OPzS is used to refer to a flooded type of tubular-plated, lead acid deep cycle batteries. These batteries generally have a cell voltage of 2 volts and are connected in series to produce higher voltages. These types of batteries are generally vented and are used in stationary applications like solar, wind, and backup energy storage. They contain a liquid electrolyte which is generally composed of diluted sulfuric acid.

OPzV battery and OPzS batteries are very popular stationary batteries, developed at the end of 2005. OPzV and OPzS batteries are high-end products, specially developed for applications that require frequent deep cycling. This is an energy-saving solution for energy storage. Even in remote installations that require long-term discharge and excellent charging performance, it can provide significant advantages in terms of single-cycle cost, the highest level of reliability and performance.

This type of lead-acid battery is commonly referred to as traction batteries. Canbat designs the OPzS series with an optimized tubular plate design which exceeds DIN standards by far. The advantages of the optimized plate are to offer excellent cycling capabilities and long service life under float conditions. Unlike other lead-acid batteries, OPzS batteries are constructed in a transparent Styrene Acrylonitrile container, which allows for an easy visual check of acid levels. The terminals are also colour-coded in black and red for easy installation. Even though these batteries are flooded, they are designed with leak-proof terminals and are completely insulated with solid copper inter-cell connectors.

OPzS stands for : O = Ortsfest (stationary) Pz = PanZerplatte (tubular plate) S = Flüssig (flooded)

Features
They have a cell voltage of 2V and have to be connected in series to produce higher voltages. Also, they are differentiated from the other types of batteries by their upright and vertical orientation. OPzS batteries also feature High Capacity, Long lifetime, Reduced Maintenance, Low Self-Discharging, Quick and simple acid level control, Economical water consumption, Appropriate dimensions and weight, and the lowest and constant maintenance current.

Differences between OPzS and OPzV batteries
OPzV is the tubular GEL battery. And OPzS is the tubular flooded battery. OPzS is a flooded cell, meaning the electrolyte (generally sulfuric acid) is in liquid form inside the cell. And the electrolyte of OPzV within the battery is in gel form which allows for recombining the electrolyte back into the water. OPzV battery is a sealed battery and users don’t need to maintain the battery. But the OPzS battery is not sealed. Users occasionally need to add distilled water to the top of the battery to maintain the normal use of the battery. OPzS and OPzV batteries are both types of the tubular-plated battery. The differences is in the nature of their electrolytes. While the acid electrolyte of OpzS is FLA, the OPzV is VRLA. It electrolyte is made into gel by the addition of silica dust. Hence they are also referred to as "silicone batteries". Also, the OPzV is valve-regulated, sealed and thus, maintenance-free.

Specifications
Here's an example of the specs of an OPzS battery:

APPLICATION
Macro Cells
Energy Storage
Switchgear and Substation
Microgrids
Medical Standby Power

TECHNOLOGY / CHEMISTRY
Flooded lead acid

CAPACITY (MIN) - EUROPE STANDARD
216

CAPACITY (MAX) - EUROPE STANDARD
3360

CAPACITY EUROPE STANDARD
Ah / C10 / 1.8Vpc / 20 °C

CAPACITY (MIN) - US STANDARD
217

CAPACITY (MAX) - US STANDARD
3543

CAPACITY US STANDARD
Ah / 8hr / 1.75Vpc / 77 °F

VOLTAGE (MIN)
2

VOLTAGE (MAX)
2

DESIGN
Top terminal
DIN sizes

References

Battery types